The Vestavia Hills church shooting occurred on June 16, 2022 at 6:22 p.m. local time in Vestavia Hills, a suburb of Birmingham, Alabama.  A man entered the St. Stephen's Episcopal Church and opened fire during a potluck meeting, which the church had previously advertised. Two people were killed at the scene, a third died later in hospital, and the suspect is subsequently in custody. The suspect was a 70 year old Birmingham man named Robert Findlay Smith (born December 23, 1951), a gun dealer.

Victims 
 Sarah Yeager, 75
 Walter Rainey, 84
 Jane Pounds, 84, initially reported injured, died at a local hospital. Her family requested that her name be withheld, but it was made public by the press.

Reactions
Following the shooting, Alabama governor Kay Ivey issued a statement saying that the shooting is "shocking and tragic," adding that "this should never happen — in a church, in a store, in the city or anywhere."

During a Sunday morning service on June 19, 2022, the church gathered to honor the members who were shot and killed during the shooting.

See also
 Gun violence in the United States
 List of mass shootings in the United States in 2022

References

June 2022 crimes in the United States
Attacks on churches in North America
Deaths by firearm in Alabama
2022 in Alabama
2022 active shooter incidents in the United States
Attacks on religious buildings and structures in the United States